The Roman Catholic Diocese of Monze is a diocese located in Monze in Zambia.

History
 March 10, 1962: Established as Diocese of Monze from the Metropolitan Archdiocese of Lusaka

Bishops
 James Corboy, S.J. (10 March 1962 – 26 November 1991)
 Paul Lungu, S.J. (26 November 1991 – 29 April 1998)
 Emilio Patriarca (22 June 1999 – 10 February 2014)
 Moses Hamungole (10 February 2014 – 13 January 2021)
 Raphael Mweempwa (25 February 2022 – present)

See also
Roman Catholicism in Zambia

References

External links 
 GCatholic.org
 Catholic Hierarchy

Roman Catholic dioceses in Zambia
Christian organizations established in 1962
Roman Catholic dioceses and prelatures established in the 20th century
Roman Catholic Ecclesiastical Province of Lusaka